Liam Joseph Roberts (born 21 November 1994) is an English professional footballer who plays as a goalkeeper for Championship side Middlesbrough. He was named
Northampton Town Player of the Season and Player's Player of the Season 2021–22.

Career

Walsall 
Roberts began his career at Walsall's youth academy before joining Romulus on a work experience loan on 4 December 2012. He was released by Walsall on 7 May 2014. However, Roberts subsequently re-signed for the club on 22 July 2014 as cover for Richard O'Donnell and Craig MacGillivray.

Roberts was immediately sent out on loan to Rushall Olympic. His loan deal with the Pics was terminated early to allow him to join Rainworth Miners Welfare on 9 September 2014. Roberts then joined Conference side Southport on 27 November 2014, alongside teammate Amadou Bakayoko. After failing to make an appearance for Southport, Roberts enjoyed a successful spell with Gresley in the second half of the season after joining on 16 January 2015. Roberts made eighteen appearances for Gresley as they challenged for a play-off place in the Northern Premier League Division One South. He was handed a new one-year contract by Walsall on 5 June 2015.

Roberts returned to Gresley on a three-month loan on 14 August 2015. He was recalled by Walsall in October, joining the matchday squad for the first time as an unused substitute in the Saddlers' victory over Burton on 10 October 2015. Six days later, Roberts joined Rugby on a one-month loan. He made six appearances for the club before returning to Walsall.

Roberts finally made his debut for Walsall on 6 February 2016 in a 3–0 home defeat against Millwall, following injuries to both Neil Etheridge and Craig MacGillivray.

In July 2016, after signing a new one-year contract with Walsall, he joined Chester on a season-long loan. He made 15 appearances in the National League, including a run of six consecutive clean sheets between September and October.

Roberts finally established himself as Walsall's first-choice goalkeeper during the 2017–18 season, making 28 appearances in all competitions and being rewarded with a new two-and-a-half-year contract on 20 February 2018. He signed a new contract in November 2019.

Northampton Town 
On 22 June 2021, Roberts signed for Northampton Town for an undisclosed fee.

Career statistics

Honours 
Individual

 EFL Golden Glove: League Two 2021–22
 Northampton Town Player of the Year: 2021–22
 PFA Team of the Year: League Two 2021–22

References

External links

1994 births
Living people
English footballers
Association football goalkeepers
Walsall F.C. players
Romulus F.C. players
Rushall Olympic F.C. players
Rainworth Miners Welfare F.C. players
Southport F.C. players
Gresley F.C. players
Rugby Town F.C. players
Chester F.C. players
Northampton Town F.C. players
English Football League players
Northern Premier League players
National League (English football) players
Sportspeople from Walsall
Middlesbrough F.C. players